The 1989 New England Patriots season was the team's 30th, and 20th in the National Football League. The Patriots finished the season with a record of five wins and eleven losses, and finished fourth in the AFC East Division. After the season, Head Coach Raymond Berry was fired and replaced by Rod Rust.

The Patriots' pass defense surrendered 7.64 yards-per-attempt in 1989, one of the ten worst totals in NFL history.  The Week 7 matchup with the San Francisco 49ers was moved to Stanford Stadium on the campus of Stanford University after the Loma Prieta earthquake, which had caused some damage to the 49ers' usual home of Candlestick Park 5 days earlier during the World Series.

Offseason

Draft

Personnel

Staff

Roster

Regular season

Schedule

Note:
Intra-division opponents are in bold text.

Game summaries

Week 1

    
    
    
    
    
    
    
    

Cedric Jones 8 Rec, 148 Yds

Standings

See also
New England Patriots seasons

References

External links
Thirty years ago, the preseason game that wrecked an entire Patriots season

New England Patriots
New England Patriots seasons
New England Patriots
Sports competitions in Foxborough, Massachusetts